The 2008–09 season of the Bayernliga, the fifth tier of the German football league system in the state of Bavaria at the time, was the 64th season of the league.

Overview
The league champions, SpVgg Weiden, were directly promoted to the Regionalliga Süd. It was Weiden's third Bayernliga title after 1953–54 and 1964–65 and their first promotion to Regionalliga level since the latter championship took them up for a season in 1965–66.

The bottom three clubs were directly relegated from the league while 15th placed SV Seligenporten had to enter the relegation round with the Landesliga runners-up where it successfully defended its league place. Of the relegated clubs Würzburger FV and 1. FC Schweinfurt 05 made an immediate return to the Bayernliga in the following season while Würzburger Kickers bypassed the league in 2012, earning promotion from the tier six Landesliga Bayern-Nord to the new tier four Regionalliga Bayern without playing in the Bayernliga.

Thomas Karg of VfL Frohnlach was the league's top scorer with 24 goals.

Table
The 2008–09 season saw seven new clubs in the league, FSV Erlangen-Bruck, FC Ingolstadt 04 II, VfL Frohnlach, TSV Buchbach, TSV Rain am Lech, SV Seligenporten and Würzburger Kickers, all promoted from the Landesliga Bayern, while no club had been relegated from the Regionalliga Süd to the league.

For Erlangen-Bruck, Ingolstadt, Buchbach, Rain and Seligenporten it was their first-ever season in the league while Frohnlach had last played in the Bayernliga in 2007 and Würzburg in 1998.

Bayernliga promotion round
The 15th placed Bayernliga team had to face the runners-up of the three Landesligas for one more place in the Bayernliga.

References

Sources

External links 
  of the Bavarian Football Association 

2008-09
5
2008–09 in European fifth tier association football leagues